Glyphipterix bifasciata is a species of sedge moth in the genus Glyphipterix. It was described by Walsingham in 1881. It is found in North America, including Washington, California and British Columbia.

The wingspan is about 15 mm.

References

Moths described in 1881
Glyphipterigidae
Moths of North America